Yaxham is a railway station in the village of Yaxham in the English county of Norfolk. The station is served by heritage services operated by the Mid-Norfolk Railway and is the site of the Yaxham Light Railway.

The station is the only one on the line that retains its original signalbox (not owned by the MNR).  The platform shelters on the up platform are still in situ, although those on the down platform used by the present service have been demolished.  The original stationmaster's house survives as a private residence, as does the original railway hotel on the opposite side of the road to the station.

History 

The station was opened by the Norfolk Railway on 15 February 1847 on the Wymondham to Dereham branch line. Yaxham was north of Thuxton and south of the terminus, Dereham. It was closed to freight on 13 July 1964, and to passengers on 6 October 1969.

The station's survival is mostly due to the late Mr D.C. Potter who took over the tenancy of the buildings, thereby saving them from demolition.  Mr Potter opened the site's first narrow gauge line in the former goods yard in 1967.  This was constructed for his Hunslet 0-4-0ST, "Cackler", and the disused tracks of this line can still be seen from passing trains on the Mid-Norfolk Railway.  It was stated that these would be removed during 2013 to allow for the construction of a standard gauge siding in the yard for Norfolk Heritage Steam Railway Ltd who were restoring a steam locomotive at Yaxham, but in the event the locomotive moved to Bressingham in 2018.

In 1969 the loco was moved across the standard gauge line to the Yaxham Park Light Railway (YPLR), which ran for over half a mile in meadows beyond the station, eventually being replaced by today's Yaxham Light Railway. The station reopened on 23 December 1995.

Facilities 

Yaxham was a two-platform station.  The main building, which included the Stationmaster's house was built by the Norfolk Railway.  The Great Eastern Railway later added glass-fronted waiting rooms to the platforms.

The station was equipped with two goods yards, both on the down side of the formation.  The main yard was to the south of the level crossing, equipped with a goods shed, coal wharf, cattle pen and end-loading dock, A smaller set of private sidings to the north of the level crossing served a granary.

Only the down platform remains in railway use, with its waiting room having been demolished.  The brick-built goods shed survives, now isolated from the railway, being used by a company restoring steam locomotives and traction engines.  The up line waiting room is used by an upholsterer.

Signal box

Services

References

Bibliography

External links 

Heritage railway stations in Norfolk
Former Great Eastern Railway stations
Railway stations in Great Britain opened in 1847
Railway stations in Great Britain closed in 1969
1847 establishments in England